ILH may refer to:

Interscholastic League of Honolulu, a group of high school teams from Honolulu
International League of Humanists, a non-profit international association
Illesheim Army Heliport, IATA airport code ILH